In My Country, is a 2017 Nigerian action film directed and produced by Frank Rajah Arase. The film stars Sam Dede, and Bimbo Manuel in lead roles along with Okawa Shaznay, Austin Enabulele and Precious Udoh made supportive roles. The film revolves around a teacher who needs to raise money for her daughter's life-saving expensive surgery.

The film received mostly positive critics acclaim and screened worldwide. In 2018 at the Africa Movie Academy Awards, the film received six nominations: Best Actor in a Leading Role, Best Actress in a Leading Role, Best Director, Best Nigerian Film, Best Young/Promising Actor, Achievement in Production Design and Best Film.

Cast
 Sam Dede as Afam
 Bimbo Manuel as Minister
 Okawa Shaznay as Adesuwa
 Austin Enabulele as Okoti
 Precious Udoh as Eno
 Shan George as Sophia
 Beatrice Akonjom as Bank Manager
 Queen-Zoey Ansa as Doctor Suresh
 Victor Dominion as A.S.P.
 Georgina Ekpeyong as Mama Adesuya
 Noble Emmanuel as Remi
 Godwin Enyinnaya as Lawyer
 Eunice Etim as Radical Student
 Orok Etim as Rev. Bako
 Eme Eyamba as Doctor Franka
 Christian Julius as Stranger
 Fortune Luke as Mr. Miller
 Imaobong Maurice as Head Teacher
 Charles Onun as Inspector Ali
 Edak Tottsman as Commissioner
 Mina Umokoro as Jackie Okoro

References

External links 
 

English-language Nigerian films
2017 films
2017 action films
2010s English-language films